Billy Bunny's Animal Songs (also known as Muppet Sing Alongs: Billy Bunny's Animal Songs) is a direct-to-video musical film featuring The Muppets. It is the first direct-to-video feature film in The Muppets franchise. It was the first of the titles in the Muppet Sing-Alongs series filmed in 1990 before production on The Muppets Celebrate Jim Henson and released on May 21, 1993. This film was credited as one of Carmen Osbahr's first projects with the Muppets and also served as one of Richard Hunt's final works before his death.

Plot

Kermit the Frog welcomes the viewer to the Muppet Sing-Along Video and allows us to hear a story about a bunny who travels outside his home to learn new songs from his animal friends and to sing-along to them.

The story begins when Billy Bunny is at his family home, singing "Hoppity-Boppity", which is the only song he knows, much to the annoyance of his family. Billy's mommy asks him to go outside to learn new songs. Billy first stops by at a gopher village, where he discovers that every gopher looks the same, despite them having different personalities ("We Are Different"). Next, he meets three polite bears - Cecil, Edgar, and Percival - who sing a rap about their personalities and why they roar ("Bear Rap").

Next, Billy meets a termite, who sings about his joys of eating wood ("The Termite Chew"). As Billy enters a deep forest, he meets two raccoons. When he asks them what they're doing here in the woods, they explain that it's a secret and they sing about it ("I Have a Secret").

Next, Billy accidentally bumps into a porcupine. He appears to be fine, but the porcupine invites him to her nightclub and sings "Please Don't Bump Into Me", about less harmful things to bump into, such as a beagle and a kangaroo. Midway, during the instrumental break, a penguin waiter asks Billy what he'd say to a little carrot juice (Billy: "Well, I’d say ’hello, little carrot juice’.") When the porcupine's song is over, she asks Billy if she'd like to stay for the second show. Billy leaves, right before the penguin arrives with a glass of carrot juice.

Next, Billy goes over to a pond, where he meets some frogs, who sing about their "Frog Talk". Finally, Billy meets a turtle and asks if he knows any songs. The turtle says he doesn't know much... except that he likes to observe what's going on around the bay and then does a "teeter-totter" on a rock and swims away. The turtle sums it up into a song - "Swim Away, Hooray!" - and Billy joins in with him. It's now late and Billy has to go home.

When Billy comes home just in time for dinner, he explains to his family that he knows eight songs, and the one song that's his favorite is "Hoppity-Boppity". Billy's family joins in with him and Kermit thanks the viewers for singing along with Billy. All the animals reprise "Hoppity-Boppity" together, ending the video.

Cast

Muppet performers
 Kevin Clash - Billy Bunny
 Fran Brill - Frog, Porcupine
 Richard Hunt - Edgar Bear, Raccoon
 Rick Lyon - 
 Jim Martin - Frog, Gopher
 Joey Mazzarino - Frog
 Kathryn Mullen - Mother Bunny, Frog, Gopher
 Jerry Nelson - Cecil Bear, Frog, Raccoon, Turtle
 Carmen Osbahr - Gopher
 David Rudman - Frog, Gopher, Penguin, Percival Bear, Termite
 Steve Whitmire - Kermit the Frog

Other appearances
 Billy Bunny appeared in Muppet Sing Alongs It's Not Easy Being Green and a Muppet Time sketch where he tries to join the Frog Scouts.
 The puppet for the Porcupine appeared in The Muppet Christmas Carol.
 The puppet for the Termite appeared in No, You Shut Up!

References

External links
 Billy Bunny's Animal Songs at Muppet Wiki

The Muppets films
1993 films
American children's films
1990s English-language films
1990s American films